Genesis Archive #2: 1976–1992 is the second box set by English rock band Genesis. It was released on 6 November 2000 on Virgin and Atlantic Records as the follow-up to their previous retrospective box set, Genesis Archive 1967–75 (1998). This set covers the band's history post 1975, when drummer Phil Collins replaced original lead singer Peter Gabriel.

Contents
The three discs consist of live recordings (mostly previously unreleased, with a few that had been B-sides), 12" remixes, a "work-in-progress" jam, non-album B-sides, and tracks from the Spot the Pigeon and 3×3 EPs. There was minor backlash from fans as "Match of the Day" and "Me and Virgil" were left off the set (although both had been released on CD before) due to Tony Banks and Mike Rutherford disliking the former track, while Phil Collins disliked the latter one. However, the band later changed their minds about the songs, and they were re-released on the Genesis 1976–1982 box set. Additionally, "Submarine" and "It's Yourself", neither of which had been released on CD before, were both edited—the former due to damage to the master tape, and the latter due to the band's preference. "Submarine" was later re-released in its original unedited form on the Genesis 1976–1982 box set.

Release

Genesis Archive 2: 1976–1992 reached No. 103 in the UK.

Track listing

Personnel
Tony Banks - keyboards, background vocals
Phil Collins - drums, percussion, vocals
Mike Rutherford - guitars, bass, background vocals
Steve Hackett - guitars on Disc 1, Track 9; Disc 2, Track 9; and Disc 3; Tracks 10 and 11

Additional personnel

Daryl Stuermer - bass, guitar on Disc 2 (except "Entangled") and on Disc 3, Tracks 4, 5 and 6
Chester Thompson - percussion, drums on Disc 2 (except "Entangled") and on Disc 3, Tracks 4, 5 and 6
Bill Bruford - percussion on Disc 2, Track 9

References

Albums produced by Nick Davis (record producer)
Albums produced by Hugh Padgham
Albums produced by David Hentschel
B-side compilation albums
Genesis (band) compilation albums
2000 compilation albums
Atlantic Records compilation albums
Virgin Records compilation albums